Yusefabad (also Romanized as Yūsefābād) is a village in Aliabad Rural District, in the Central District of Anbarabad County, Kerman Province, Iran. At the 2006 census, its population was 1,097, in 251 families.

References 

Populated places in Anbarabad County